In sports, a loan involves a particular player being able to temporarily play for a club other than the one to which they are currently contracted. Loan deals may last from a few weeks to a full season, sometimes persisting for multiple seasons at a time. A loan fee can be arranged by the parent club as well as them asking to pay a percentage of their wages.

Association football
Players may be loaned out to other clubs for several reasons. Most commonly, young prospects will be loaned to a club in a lower league in order to gain invaluable first team experience. In this instance, the parent club may continue to pay the player's wages in full or in part. Some clubs put a formal arrangement in place with a feeder club for this purpose, such as Manchester United and Royal Antwerp, Arsenal and Beveren, or Chelsea and Vitesse. In other leagues such as Italy's Serie A, some smaller clubs have a reputation as a "farm club" and regularly take players, especially younger players, on loan from larger clubs.

A club may take a player on loan if they are short on transfer funds but can still pay wages, or as temporary cover for injuries or suspensions. The parent club might demand a fee or that the loaning club pays some or all of the player's wages during the loan period. A club might seek to loan out a squad player to make a saving on his wages, or a first team player to regain match fitness following an injury.

A loan may be made to get around a transfer window. Such a loan might include an agreed fee for a permanent transfer when the next transfer window opens.

Some players are loaned because they are unhappy or in dispute with their current club and no other club wishes to buy them permanently.

In the Premier League, players on loan are not permitted to play against the team which holds their registration (section 7.2 of rule M.6). Loanees are, however, allowed to play against their 'owning' clubs in cup competitions, unless they are cup-tied (i.e. have played for their owning club in that cup during that season).

Unpaid trialists

In the Scottish Professional Football League (and previously the Scottish Football League), clubs are permitted to take players on as unpaid trialists even for competitive fixtures. Sometimes for the first two weeks of a trial period players' names are obfuscated; match reports use the convention "A Trialist" to refer to such players in lieu of using their real names.

Rugby league
Player loans occur in rugby league for similar reasons to soccer.  In the United Kingdom the Rugby Football League (RFL) stipulate that loans must last for at least 28 days. There is no bar against a player playing for the loan club against the parent club unless this has been specified in the loan agreement.  In Australia the National Rugby League (NRL) does not normally allow loans due to the feeder club arrangement but the Covid-19 pandemic forced a review of the situation and in 2020 loans were allowed.

Guest appearances
In the First World War the RFL relaxed player registration rules to allow players to play for clubs close to their military base or workplace. 
Confusion could arise; in 1917 Billy Batten was working near to Dewsbury so Dewsbury selected him to play against his registered club, Hull FC. Hull had also selected Batten to play in the same game. On this occasion Batten chose to play for Dewsbury. During the Second World War the RFL allowed players to play as guests for another club on a match by match basis as long as the owning club agreed to the appearance.  The system also allowed players whose club had suspended operations to play while still being registered to the original club Clubs made full use of the guest system; in the 1940–41 Championship final between Wigan and Bradford, Wigan featured guest players from Liverpool Stanley, Salford and Hull Kingston Rovers while Bradford included guests from Salford and Leeds.

See also
Free transfer
Rugby League Dual registration

References

Terminology used in multiple sports
Association football terminology
Rugby league terminology
Rugby union terminology
Loans
Sports labor relations